Volkan Kürşat Bekiroğlu (born December 30, 1977 in Kadirli, Turkey) is a Turkish retired footballer who last played for Adanaspor. He is playing leftback and left midfield.  Standing at 175 cm, he wears the number 47 jersey. His brother Serkan Bekiroğlu is also footballer and currently plays for Karşıyaka S.K.

He played 3 times for Turkey U21.

He played for Adanaspor, Trabzonspor, Gaziantepspor (loan), Trabzonspor (loan back), Malatyaspor and Bursaspor.

Honours

Club
Trabzonspor
Turkish Cup: 2003–04

References

External links 
 Profile at TFF.org

1977 births
Living people
People from Kadirli
Turkish footballers
Turkey B international footballers
Adanaspor footballers
Trabzonspor footballers
Gaziantepspor footballers
Malatyaspor footballers
Bursaspor footballers
Süper Lig players
Association football midfielders
Association football defenders